Hofsee is a lake at Kargow in Mecklenburgische Seenplatte, Mecklenburg-Vorpommern, Germany. At an elevation of 65 m, its surface area is 0.147 km².

Lakes of Mecklenburg-Western Pomerania